The Twillingodden Formation is a geologic formation in Svalbard, Norway. It preserves fossils dating back to the Smithian (Early Triassic) period.

See also 
 List of fossiliferous stratigraphic units in Norway

References

Further reading 
 H. A. Nakrem and A. Mork. 1991. New early Triassic Bryozoa (Trepostomata) from Spitsbergen, with some remarks on the stratigraphy of the investigated horizons. Geological Magazine 128(2):129-140

Geologic formations of Norway
Triassic System of Europe
Triassic Norway
Olenekian Stage
Limestone formations
Geology of Svalbard